That's the Way It Is may refer to:

Elvis: That's the Way It Is, a 1970 documentary film about Elvis Presley
That's the Way It Is (Elvis Presley album), a 1970 album by Elvis Presley
"That's the Way It Is" (Mel and Kim song), a 1988 song performed by Mel and Kim Appleby 
That's the Way It Is (Milt Jackson album), a 1969 album by the jazz vibraphone player Milt Jackson 
"That's the Way It Is" (Celine Dion song), a 1999 song by Celine Dion
...That's the Way It Is, a 1976 album by Harry Nilsson
"Kore ga Watashi no Ikiru Michi" ("That's the Way It Is"), a song by Puffy AmiYumi
"And that's the way it is...", the sign-off/catchphrase of American television journalist Walter Cronkite
"That's The Way It Is", a song from the 2018 video game Red Dead Redemption 2

See also
"That's Just the Way It Is", a 1990 song by Phil Collins
 The Way It Is (disambiguation)